Francisco Pizano Vera  (born 17 August 1987 in Guanajuato, Mexico) is a former Mexican footballer, who last played for Club Universidad de Guadalajara in Ascenso MX.

Career
He began his career 2007 with Club Leon that same year he made his professional debut against Salamanca F.C. In 2009, he signed with Club Tijuana where he only spent one year before returning to Club Leon for the 2010-2011 tournament. On June 9, 2011, he was signed by Primera División (First Division) club Puebla FC.

External links
Player Profile BDFA
Player Profile SoccerWay

Footnotes

1987 births
Living people
Footballers from Guanajuato
People from Salvatierra, Guanajuato
Club León footballers
Club Tijuana footballers
Club Puebla players
Liga MX players
Mexican footballers
Association football defenders